Pierreodendron kerstingii is a species of tree in the family Simaroubaceae. It is endemic to West Africa and found in Ivory Coast, Ghana, Togo, and Benin. It is sometimes considered synonym of Pierreodendron africanum, which would then be a widespread species distributed south to Angola and east to the Democratic Republic of the Congo.

Description and uses
The flowers are red and ripe fruits are yellow. The bark is used as insecticide and rat poison, and the extract has anti-tumor properties.

Habitat and conservation
Pierreodendron kerstingii occurs in heavily exploited, semi-deciduous forests. It is an uncommon species threatened by habitat loss.

References

kerstingii
Trees of Benin
Flora of Ghana
Flora of Ivory Coast
Flora of Togo
Vulnerable plants
Taxonomy articles created by Polbot